Harold Turpin could refer to: 

Hal Turpin (1903–1997), American minor league baseball player
Harold John Turpin, British draughtsman and one of the inventors of the Sten gun